The Light Miniature Aircraft LM-5 series is a family of American high-wing, conventional landing gear, strut-braced, single-engine ultralight aircraft that are intended to resemble the Piper PA-18 Super Cub. The designs are all available as plans from Light Miniature Aircraft of Okeechobee, Florida for amateur construction.

The Light Miniature Aircraft company website domain name expired on 25 May 2010 and has not been renewed. The company seems to have gone out of business about 2010, but Wicks Aircraft continues to provide kits for the designs.

Design and development
The LM-5 design is rendered in wood or optionally aluminum and covered in doped aircraft fabric. The aircraft are sold as plans, with components or complete kits also available to speed construction time.

Unlike the company's LM-1 series which are scale representations of famous general aviation aircraft, the LM-5 series are the same size as the PA-18 that they resemble.

Variants
LM-5X Super Cub
Tandem two-seat full-sized replica of a Piper PA-18 Super Cub, powered by a  Rotax 582 or Volkswagen air-cooled engine. Built from aluminum and covered in doped aircraft fabric. Empty weight , gross weight . The LM-5X was first flown in 1991 and was still available in 2010.
LM-5X-W Super Cub
Tandem two-seat full-sized replica of a Piper PA-18 Super Cub, powered by a  Rotax 582 or Volkswagen air-cooled engine. Built from wood and covered in doped aircraft fabric. Empty weight , gross weight . Still available in 2010.

Specifications (LM-5X-W Super Cub)

See also

References

External links
 - former location
Light Miniature Aircraft on Archive.org
Photo of an LM-5X-W

1990s United States ultralight aircraft
Homebuilt aircraft
Light Miniature Aircraft aircraft